Siege of Taormina may refer to:

 Siege of Taormina (962), Fatimid conquest of Sicily
 Siege of Taormina (1078)
 Siege of Taormina (1676)

Military history of Sicily 
Siege warfare